Saskatchewan is one of Canada's provinces, and has established several provincial symbols.

Symbols

References

Saskatchewan
Symbols
Canadian provincial and territorial symbols
Provincial symbols of Saskatchewan